Fernando Peixoto Costanza (born 28 November 1998) is a Italian-Brazilian footballer who plays as a defensive midfielder for Krylia Sovetov.

Club career
Born in Rio de Janeiro, Costanza joined Botafogo's youth setup in 2014, from Fluminense. In December 2016, he signed a professional contract with the club.

On 28 August 2018, Costanza moved abroad and joined Lille OSC on a one-year loan deal. In the following March, after only appearing for their reserve team in the CFA, he was recalled.

Costanza made his first team – and Série A – debut on 5 May 2019, starting in a 1–0 home win against Fortaleza.

On 30 January 2022, Krylia Sovetov announced the signing of Fernando from Sheriff Tiraspol.

Personal life
Costanza also holds the citizenship of Italy and was registered with the Russian Premier League as an Italian player.

Career statistics

References

External links

1998 births
Living people
Footballers from Rio de Janeiro (city)
Brazilian footballers
Association football defenders
Botafogo de Futebol e Regatas players
Lille OSC players
FC Sheriff Tiraspol players
PFC Krylia Sovetov Samara players
Campeonato Brasileiro Série A players
Championnat National 2 players
Moldovan Super Liga players
Russian Premier League players
Brazilian expatriate footballers
Brazilian expatriate sportspeople in France
Expatriate footballers in France
Brazilian expatriate sportspeople in Moldova
Expatriate footballers in Moldova
Brazilian expatriate sportspeople in Russia
Expatriate footballers in Russia